This is a list of Category A listed buildings in the Scottish Borders council area in south-east Scotland.

In Scotland, the term listed building refers to a building or other structure officially designated as being of "special architectural or historic interest".  Category A structures are those considered to be "buildings of national or international importance, either architectural or historic, or fine little-altered examples of some particular period, style or building type." Listing was begun by a provision in the Town and Country Planning (Scotland) Act 1947, and the current legislative basis for listing is the Planning (Listed Buildings and Conservation Areas) (Scotland) Act 1997.  The authority for listing rests with Historic Scotland, an executive agency of the Scottish Government, which inherited this role from the Scottish Development Department in 1991. Once listed, severe restrictions are imposed on the modifications allowed to a building's structure or its fittings. Listed building consent must be obtained from local authorities prior to any alteration to such a structure. There are approximately 47,400 listed buildings in Scotland, of which around 8% (some 3,800) are Category A.

There are 182 Category A listed buildings in the area.

Listed buildings

{{HS listed building row
 | notes = <ref>

|}

See also
 Scheduled monuments in the Scottish Borders

Notes

References

External links

Scottish Borders